is a Japanese actress best known for appearing in several Toho kaiju films of the 1960s and early 1970s.

Early life
Mizuno was born Maya Igarashi on 1 January 1937 in Sanjō Niigata prefecture, Japan. She was acquainted with Giant Baba, her junior by one year, who is also from Sanjō.  She enrolled and eventually graduated from an acting school and began a professional career in film in 1957 in Crazy Society (Shochiku). In 1958 she appeared in Nemuri Kyōshirō: Record of an Outlaw : Demon-blade Hell (Toho).

Career
Her most famous roles include Miss Namikawa in Invasion of Astro-Monster, Dr. Sueko Togami in Frankenstein Conquers the World, and the island girl Dayo in Godzilla vs. the Sea Monster. She is also known for her role as Azami in the 1959 epic The Birth of Japan. By the time she started working on A Bridge for Us Alone (1958), her second movie, her name had changed to Kumi Mizuno. Mizuno first worked with director Ishirō Honda in Seniors, Juniors, Co-Workers in 1959. She would later work with Honda in Attack of the Mushroom People, Frankenstein Conquers the World, Godzilla vs. the Sea Monster, Gorath, Invasion of Astro-Monster and The War of the Gargantuas.  

In 1991, she played Kanako Yanagawa in Kihachi Okamoto's Rainbow Kids.

Mizuno returned to the kaiju genre for 2002's Godzilla Against Mechagodzilla, and again for 2004's Godzilla: Final Wars.

Filmography

Films
Crazy Society (1957)
A Bridge for Us Alone (1958), Chie Kimura
A Holiday in Tokyo (1958)
The Spell of the Hidden Gold (1958)
Herringbone Clouds (1958)
The Three Treasures (1959), Azami
One Day I... (1959), Hideko Kawamura
Seniors, Juniors, Co-Workers (1959)
Lips Forbidden to Talk (1959)
Fox and Tanuki (1959), Sagawa Kayoko
Whistle in My Heart (1959)
Westward Desperado (1960), Hashima
The Gambling Samurai (1960), Kiku
Wanton Journey (1960)
Challenge to Live (1961)
The Merciless Trap (1961)
The Crimson Sea (1961)
Witness Killed (1961)
Counterstroke (1961)
Big Shots Die at Dawn (1961)
The Underworld Bullet Marks (1961)
Kill the Killer! (1961)
Gorath (1962), Takiko Nomura
Chushingura (1962), Saho
The Crimson Sky (1962)
Operation X (1962)
Operation Enemy Fort (1962)
Weed of Crime (1962)
Matango (1963), Mami Sekiguchi
Samurai Pirate (1963), Miwa, Rebel Leader
Interpol Code 8 (1963), Saeko Kinomiya
Sink or Swim (1963), Tomie Tazawa
Warring Clans (1963)
Trap of Suicide Kilometer (1964)
Blood and Diamonds (1964)
Whirlwind (1964), Witch
Invasion of Astro-Monster (1965), Miss Namikawa
Key of Keys (1965)
White Rose of Hong Kong (1965)
Frankenstein vs. Baragon (1965), Dr. Sueko Togami
Ebirah, Horror of the Deep (1966), Dayo, Ifant Islander
The War of the Gargantuas (1966), Akemi, Stewart's Assistant
The Killing Bottle (1967)
Love is in the Green Wind (1974), Mother
Mysterious Robber Ruby (1988)
Rainbow Kids (1991), Kanako Yanagawa, 1st Daughter
Florence My Love (1991)
Graduation Journey: I Came from Japan (1993)
Godzilla Against Mechagodzilla (2002), Machiko Tsuge, Prime Minister
Godzilla: Final Wars (2004), Akiko Namikawa, E.D.F. Commander
Amanogawa (2019)

Television
Segodon (2018), Saigō Takamori's grandmother

Honours
Kinuyo Tanaka Award (2017)

References

External links

Japanese film actresses
1937 births
Living people
Japanese female models